Tahir Mahmood (born 15 September 1962) is a Pakistani former cricketer. He played 48 first-class and 24 List A matches for several domestic teams in Pakistan between 1981 and 2003.

See also
 List of Pakistan Automobiles Corporation cricketers

References

External links
 

1962 births
Living people
Pakistani cricketers
Gujranwala cricketers
Pakistan Automobiles Corporation cricketers
Sialkot cricketers
Cricketers from Sialkot